Jovan Radonić (9 February 1873, Mol, Austria-Hungary — 25 November 1956, Yugoslavia) was a Serbian historian, librarian of Matica Srpska library and member of the Serbian Academy of Sciences and Arts.

Biography
Radonić graduated from the University of Vienna, where he studied under the tutelage of Konstantin Jireček and Vatroslav Jagić, and attended seminars given by Karl Krumbacher in Munich. In 1905, he taught at the University of Belgrade. In 1948 he joined the staff of the Institute of History of the Serbian Academy of Sciences. Radonić, a Slavist and Byzantinist, devoted his research to Balkan medieval history. He translated into Serbian and expanded Jireček’s History of the Serbs (vols. 1–4, Belgrade, 1922–25; 2nd ed., Belgrade, 1952).

He dedicated his first book to Ilarion Ruvarac who established critical approach of Serbian historiography. In his work Đurađ Kastriot Skenderbeg i Arbanija u XV veku he had collected major documentary and literary sources about Skanderbeg.

Selected works 

 
 
 
 
 
 
 
 
 (In Serbian) Rimska kurija i južnoslovenske zemlje of XVI do XIX veka (Roman Curia and South-Slavic lands from the sixteenth to the nineteenth centuries), Belgrade, Srpska akademija nauka, 1950
 (in Serbian) Ogledalo sveta ili Istroija Mehmeda Nešrije (The Mirror of the World or the History of Mehmed Neşri), Belgrade, Naučna knjiga, 1957

References

External links 
 Short biography of Jovan Radonić on the web site of Serbian Academy of Sciences and Arts

1873 births
1956 deaths
20th-century Serbian historians
Members of the Serbian Academy of Sciences and Arts
Historians from the Austro-Hungarian Empire
Yugoslav historians